The Girl's House is a 2015 film directed by Shahram Shah Hosseini, written by Parviz Shahbazi and produced by Mohammad Shayesteh and starring Hamed Behdad, Baran Kowsari, Pegah Ahangrani and Rana Azadivar.

After its release at the Fajr Film Festival, the film faced a lot of margins and parts of the film's story were removed. After changing the direction of the story, the girl's house was released in a limited way in Iranian cinemas on October 10, 2017.

Movie story 
The film tells the story of a girl named Samira who intends to marry Mansour. The day before her wedding, she takes Mansour Samira's mother to a gynecologist for an examination, but Samira, shocked by this, stops her and commits suicide in the street. , After learning of his death to two of his classmates, they look for the cause of his friend's death, but the reason for Samira's father's suicide is hidden.

Cast 

 Hamed Behdad in the role of Mansour
 Kowsari rain in the role of spring
 Pegah Ahangrani in the role of Parisa
 Rana Azadivar in the role of Samira
 Babak Karimi as Samira's father
 Behnaz Jafari in the role of Aunt Mansour
 Mohammad Reza Hedayati in the role of the hall manager
 Nasim Adabi as Mansour's sister
 Amir Ali Nabaviyan in the role of Reza
 Nader Fallah in the role of housekeeper
 Roya Teymourian in the role of Mansour's mother
 Hanif Soltani Sarvestani in the role of Mansour's student

Festivals and awards 

 The fifth film from the public point of view (2.65) in the 33rd Fajr Film Festival
 Iran's representative at the Tokyo International Film Festival

References

External links 
 

2015 films
Iranian thriller films
2015 thriller films
2010s Persian-language films